Sokol Did Not Love Him (Sokol ga nije volio) is a Croatian film directed by Branko Schmidt. It was released in 1988.

External links
 

1988 films
1980s Croatian-language films
Croatian war films
1980s war films
War films set in Partisan Yugoslavia
Croatian World War II films
Yugoslav World War II films